Marketing Greece S.A. is a non-profit organization founded in 2013 established to promote tourism in Greece. A private sector initiative, its shareholders include the Greek Tourism Confederation (SETE) (80%), the Hellenic Chamber of Hotels (17.5%) and the Hellenic Association of Communication Agencies (2.5%).

It launched a consumer website, Discovergreece.com, in February 2014. Prior to the portal's launch, Marketing Greece commissioned a report by McKinsey & Company called Tourism Strategic Planning 2021, in which the management consultancy firm outlined a target for annual tourist arrivals into Greece in 2021 to exceed 24 million with a per capita expenditure of approximately 800 euros. This would generate direct annual revenue of 18-19 billion euros and a total of 48-50 billion euros, taking into account all tourism-related activities, compared to 32 billion euros in 2012. This, the report concluded, would add an additional nine points to the country's GDP.

References

External links 

Tourism in Greece